George Howell (June 28, 1859 – November 19, 1913) was an American educator and politician who served as a Democratic member of the U.S. House of Representatives from Pennsylvania.

Biography
George Howell was born in Scranton, Pennsylvania. He attended the public schools, the Pennington Seminary in Pennington, New Jersey, the Newton Collegiate Institute in Newton, Pennsylvania, and Lafayette College in Easton, Pennsylvania. He graduated from the Illinois State Normal University at Normal.

He taught school fourteen years in Illinois, New Jersey, and Pennsylvania, and served seven years as superintendent of the public schools of Scranton.

He studied law, was admitted to the bar in 1904 and commenced practice in Scranton. He presented credentials as a Democratic Member-elect to the Fifty-eighth Congress and served from March 4, 1903 to February 10, 1904, when he was succeeded by William Connell, who contested the election.

He was assistant principal of the Scranton Technical High School from 1906 to 1908, and served as superintendent of schools from 1908 until his death in Scranton. Interred in Forest Hill Cemetery.

Sources
 
 The Political Graveyard

1859 births
1913 deaths
Politicians from Scranton, Pennsylvania
American people of Welsh descent
19th-century American politicians
Democratic Party members of the United States House of Representatives from Pennsylvania
The Pennington School alumni
Lafayette College alumni
Schoolteachers from Pennsylvania